U.S. Route 22 (US 22) is a west–east route and is one of the original United States highways of 1926, running from Cincinnati, Ohio, at US 27, US 42, US 127, and US 52 to Newark, New Jersey, at U.S. Route 1/9 in the Newark Airport Interchange.

US 22 is named William Penn Highway throughout most of Pennsylvania. In southwest Ohio, it overlaps with State Route 3 and is familiarly known as the 3C Highway, "22 and 3", and Montgomery Road.

A section of US 22 in Pennsylvania between New Alexandria at U.S. Route 119 and Harrisburg at Interstate 81 has been designated a part of Corridor M of the Appalachian Development Highway System.

Route description 
 

|-
|OH
|244.1
|392.82
|-
|WV
|6.01
|9.65
|-
|PA
|338.20
|544.28
|-
|NJ
|60.53
|97.41
|-
|Total
|648.84
|1044.20
|}

Ohio 

US 22 has its westernmost end-point in downtown Cincinnati—however, its eastbound and westbound end-points are not at the same intersection. Officially, US 22 Eastbound begins on Central Avenue (US 27 northbound/US 52 westbound/US 127 northbound) at 5th Street, then proceeds north, turning east onto 7th Street. Meanwhile, US 22 Westbound follows 9th Street and officially ends at Central Avenue (signage designating the end occurs much sooner, approaching Elm Street, U.S. Route 42 Northbound).

From downtown Cincinnati to Washington Court House, US 22 roughly follows the historic 3C Highway which connected Cincinnati, Columbus, and Cleveland. This section is also concurrent with State Route 3 (SR 3). At Washington Court House, SR 3 and US 22 diverge. US 22 continues to the east through Circleville to Lancaster.  From Lancaster to Zanesville, US 22 roughly follows the route of Zane's Trace, an early pioneer road blazed by Colonel Ebenezer Zane beginning in 1796.

Starting just west of Cadiz, US 22 becomes a limited-access expressway for the remainder of its 30-some miles in Ohio as it approaches and enters the Pittsburgh metropolitan area (with the exception of an at grade intersection with no stop lights or signs on US 22 and narrowing to two lanes for about a mile east of Cadiz). It junctions with State Route 7 for roughly a mile along the Ohio River shoreline in Steubenville.

West Virginia 

US 22 travels through or borders the city of Weirton for its entire length in West Virginia, from the Ohio state line over the Ohio River, to the Pennsylvania state line.

Pennsylvania 

US 22 enters Pennsylvania as a limited-access highway connecting Weirton, West Virginia, and Steubenville, Ohio, with Pittsburgh. Through much of the Pittsburgh metropolitan area, it overlaps Interstate 376 and US 30. US 30 merges with US 22 near Imperial and Pittsburgh International Airport, and both highways then merge with Interstate 376 in Robinson Township. Together, these three highways form a busy, limited-access multiplex through the city of Pittsburgh. US 30 then splits from Interstate 376 and US 22 in Wilkinsburg, and the I-376/US 22 concurrency continues to the Pennsylvania Turnpike in Monroeville, where I-376 ends.

East of Interstate 376, US 22 continues east of Pittsburgh as a primary arterial highway. The entire length between Pittsburgh and US 220 and Interstate 99 just west of Altoona was widened to at least four lanes by summer 2011.  Interstate 99 links the highway to State College and the Pennsylvania Turnpike. Heading east from Interstate 99, US 22 narrows and becomes the primary highway linking Hollidaysburg and Huntingdon.  Near Mount Union, it forms a concurrency with US 522 and the two highways go northeast along the Juniata River to Lewistown.

In Lewistown, US 22 breaks with US 522 and forms a concurrency with US 322, and the two routes travel southeast, mostly as an expressway, toward Harrisburg.  At the north end of Harrisburg, US 22 and US 322 split and US 22 runs southward toward the Farm Show complex.  From there, it turns eastward along Arsenal Boulevard, Herr Street, and Walnut Street to Jonestown Road.  Through Dauphin and Lebanon counties, US 22 parallels  Interstate 81 and Interstate 78 to the south as a four-lane arterial. East of Fredericksburg, along the border between Lebanon and Berks counties, US 22 forms a concurrency with Interstate 78, which runs to the Allentown area. Former highway alignments of US 22 that parallel this section are collectively known as the "Hex Highway", so called because of the Berks County-based Pennsylvania Dutch families that hang hex signs on their barns.

In the Lehigh Valley, US 22 is a four-lane limited-access expressway between Easton and Interstate 78 to the west; it is dually designated with the Lehigh Valley Thruway in Allentown. The original designation for this expressway was to be Interstate 78, but local opposition to a freeway in Phillipsburg, along with substandard conditions at Easton, forced federal highway officials to relocate Interstate 78 south of Allentown, Bethlehem, Easton, and Phillipsburg. U.S. 22 then crosses the Delaware River on the Easton–Phillipsburg Toll Bridge.

New Jersey 

U.S. Route 22 in New Jersey predates and was largely replaced by Interstate 78 after Interstate 78 was built between 1956 and 1989, and shares designation with I-78 from exit 3 to exit 18.  US 22 was an expressway in some segments, including the area around Perryville and Clinton.  It connects Phillipsburg with Newark in New Jersey.

US 22 has one major interchange besides I-78, that being Interstate 287, although it is not a full interchange, with two missing movements: US 22 eastbound to I-287 northbound and I-287 southbound to US 22 westbound.

One of two level crossing of the highway happens in Union County in the Union Township section of the highway (the other occurring in Lewistown, Pennsylvania). It once belonged to the Rahway Valley Railroad; the crossing was closed in 1992 when service on the railroad was ended.

History 
US 22 is one of the original U.S. Routes, though in the 1925 plan it was to terminate in Cleveland, Ohio, entering Ohio on modern U.S. Route 422. In the finalized 1926 plan, it followed the current course to U.S. Route 40, where it ended. In 1932, it had been extended to Cincinnati as it is currently, replacing Ohio State Route 10 and following preexisting State Route 3.

Before the Byrd Expressway, West Virginia's segment of U.S. 22 ran from Pennsylvania Avenue at the PA/WV state line to Main St., then left on Main St. through downtown Weirton (aligning U.S. 22 with West Virginia Route 2), and right on Freedom Way to the Fort Steuben Bridge and Ohio River to Steubenville, Ohio.  An "Alternate U.S. 22" route ran along Cove Road from Pennsylvania Avenue to the intersection of Harmon Creek Road (left turn) and the continuation of Cove Road.

With the opening of the first segment of the Byrd Expressway on March 9, 1972, U.S. 22 was reassigned, starting on the new road from the PA/WV state line, continuing on Cove Road where the expressway ended and joining the remainder of the original route at Main St.  The Pennsylvania Avenue segment of U.S. 22 from Colliers Way to Main St. was reassigned as WV Route 105 and Alt. U.S. 22 was reassigned as WV Route 507.  In 2003, WV 507 was extended along the previous U.S. 22 alignment from Cove Road to the Fort Steuben Bridge and was reassigned as County Route 507.  The Fort Steuben Bridge, which originally carried U.S. 22 across the Ohio River until the construction of the Veterans Memorial Bridge, was permanently closed on January 8, 2009, and demolished by detonation on February 21, 2012.

Major intersections

See also 
 Special routes of U.S. Route 22

References

External links 

 Speed Limits for Route 22 in New Jersey
 Endpoints of U.S. Highway 22

 
Roads in Cincinnati
22
22
22